Meanjin, formerly Meanjin Papers and Meanjin Quarterly, is an Australian literary magazine. The name is derived from the Turrbal word for the spike of land where the city of Brisbane is located. It was founded in 1940 in Brisbane, by Clem Christesen. It moved to Melbourne in 1945 and is as of 2008 an imprint of Melbourne University Publishing.

History
Meanjin was founded in December 1940 in Brisbane, by Clem Christesen. The name is derived from the Turrbal word for land on which the city of Brisbane is located.

It moved to Melbourne in 1945 at the invitation of the University of Melbourne. Artist and patron Lina Bryans opened the doors of her Darebin Bridge House to the Meanjin group: then Vance and Nettie Palmer, Rosa and Dolia Ribush, Jean Campbell, Laurie Thomas and Alan McCulloch. There they joined the moderates in the Contemporary Art Society (Norman Macgeorge, Clive Stephen, Isobel Tweddle and Rupert Bunny, Sybil Craig, Guelda Pyke, Elma Roach, Ola Cohn and Madge Freeman and George Bell). Bryans created a free circle, and was able to give the liberal, conservative modernist position in Melbourne a more vital character and a freer base than it would otherwise have had.

Meanjin Papers was published under that name until 1947, and became Meanjin from 1947 to 1960, Meanjin Quarterly from 1961 to 1976, and became Meanjin again in 1976. It includes poetry, fiction, essays, memoirs and other forms of writing, and also produces podcasts.

Since 2008 Meanjin is published as an imprint of Melbourne University Publishing (MUP).

Notable contributors
Past contributors to Meanjin include Australian writers Judith Wright, Kylie Tennant, Manning Clark, Vance & Nettie Palmer, Dymphna Cusack, Martin Boyd, Alan Marshall, Dorothy Hewett, Peter Carey, Alice Pung, Michelle de Kretser, Randa Abdel-Fattah and Dorothy Porter. International authors published include Carmen Callil, J. M. Coetzee, Jean-Paul Sartre, and Kurt Vonnegut.

Editors
 1940 to 1974: Clem Christesen
 1974 to 1982: Jim Davidson
 1982 to 1987: Judith Brett
 1987 to 1994: Jenny Lee
 1994 to 1998: Christina Thompson
 1998 to 2002: Stephanie Holt
 2002 to 2008 Ian Britain
 2008 to 2011 Sophie Cunningham
 2011 to 2012 Sally Heath
 2013 to 2015 Zora Sanders
 2015 to 2022 Jonathan Green
 2022 to present Esther Anatolitis

Poetry editors
Dates not known: Coral Hull
 mid-to-late 1970s: Kris Hemensley
1979 to 1982: Judith Rodriguez
1987 to 1994: Philip Mead
1994 to 1997: Laurie Duggan
 1998 to 2000: Coral Hull
1998: Brian Henry
2000 to 2005: Peter Minter
2005 to 2015: Judith Beveridge
2015 to present: Bronwyn Lea

References

Further reading

External links
 

1940 establishments in Australia
Literary magazines published in Australia
Quarterly magazines published in Australia
Magazines established in 1940
Magazines published in Melbourne
Poetry literary magazines
University of Melbourne